Nidhi Subbaiah (born 16 February 1987) is an Indian actress and model, who has appeared in various television advertisements and films, she is known for her performance in successful Kannada movies such as Pancharangi (2010) and Krishnan Marriage Story (2011). She made her Bollywood debut with Oh My God (in a guest appearance role), and Ajab Gazabb Love (in a lead role).

Early life
Nidhi was born on 16 February 1987 in the Kodagu district of Karnataka as the only child to Bollachanda Subhash Subbaiah and Jhansi Subbaiah. Soon afterwards, her family later moved to Mysore, where she spent most of her childhood and completed her education.

Nidhi had made her mark in sports by winning gold medals at national level sports meets in sailing while she was studying II PUC in Mysore. She also has the credit of winning three gold medals in a calendar year at the sports meet in sailing events at Visakhapatnam in Andhra Pradesh and at Chilka Lake in Orissa.

Besides being a sportsperson of repute, Nidhi was also a Naval NCC cadet who won the best cadet award in the year 2004.

An alumnus of St. Joseph's Central, Mysore, Mahajanas PU college, Mysore, she went on to study Civil Engineering from Sri Jayachamarajendra College of Engineering (SJCE), Mysore. She quit in the second year as her modelling career took off and this ultimately led her to pursue a career in acting.

Personal life
Subbaiah married her longtime boyfriend entrepreneur Lavesh Khairajani in 2017 in Coorg, Karnataka. They were divorced in 2018.

Career
She first ventured into modelling, appearing in various television commercials, with Fair & Lovely being the most notable, through which she landed her first acting assignment. She made her acting debut with Abhimani in 2009, which did not fare well at the box office. She has also acted in Suri's Anna Bond that features her alongside Puneeth Rajkumar and Priyamani. The film did fairly well at the box office. She will be making a special appearance in Poornima Mohan's School Days. Nidhi's first Bollywood outing was Oh My God, which starred Akshay Kumar. She had a cameo in the movie. Nidhi's first Bollywood movie as a leading actress was Ajab Gazabb Love, where she co-stars with Jackky Bhagnani.

Currently, she is one of the contestants in the present Bigg Boss Kannada (season 8) and got evicted on 4 July 2021 as the first contestant to be evicted in the second innings.

Filmography

Television

2021 - Bigg Boss Kannada Season 8 
2021 - Bigg Boss Second Innings

References

External links

 
 
 
 

1985 births
Kannada people
People from Kodagu district
Actresses from Karnataka
Indian film actresses
Actresses in Kannada cinema
Actresses in Hindi cinema
Living people
Kodava people
Actresses in Telugu cinema
21st-century Indian actresses
Female models from Karnataka